SIIMA Short Film Awards is an award ceremony held annually to award the excellence in Short Films of four different languages – Telugu, Tamil, Kannada and Malayalam.

The ceremony was started in 2017 by Vibri Media Group.

History 
After successfully conducting the SIIMA for five years continuously, Vishnu Vardhan Induri who is the head of Vibri Media Group announced that they are going to start 'SIIMA Short Film Awards' to reward the aspiring and talented Short filmmakers and actors.

Ceremonies

References 

South Indian International Movie Awards
South India
Telugu film awards
Indian film awards